Borel may refer to:

People
 Borel (author), 18th-century French playwright 
 Borel (1906–1967), pseudonym of the French actor Jacques Henri Cottance
 Émile Borel (1871 – 1956), a French mathematician known for his founding work in the areas of measure theory and probability
 Armand Borel (1923 – 2003), a Swiss mathematician
 Mary Grace Borel (1915 – 1998), American socialite

Places
 Borel (crater), a lunar crater, named after Émile Borel

Mathematics
 Borel algebra, operating on Borel sets, named after Émile Borel, also:
 Borel measure, the measure on a Borel algebra
 Borel distribution, a discrete probability distribution, also named after Émile Borel
 Borel subgroup, in the theory of algebraic groups, named after Armand Borel

Other uses
 Borel (surname), a surname
 Etablissements Borel, an aircraft manufacturing company founded by Gabriel Borel

See also
Borrel
Borrell